Coralliophila bulbiformis is a species of sea snail, a marine gastropod mollusk, in the family Muricidae, the murex snails or rock snails.

Distribution
This species occurs in New Zealand Exclusive Economic Zone. and off New Caledonia.

References

 Souverbie, M. (1861) Descriptions d'espèces nouvelles de l'Archipel Calédonien. Journal de Conchyliologie, 9, 271–284, pl. 11.
 Brook, F. J. (1998). Stratigraphy and paleontology of Pleistocene submarine volcanic-sedimentary sequences at the northern Kermadec Islands. Journal of the Royal Society of New Zealand 28: 235-257
 Oliverio, M. (2008). Coralliophilinae (Neogastropoda: Muricidae) from the southwest Pacific. in: Héros, V. et al. (Ed.) Tropical Deep-Sea Benthos 25. Mémoires du Muséum national d'Histoire naturelle (1993). 196: 481-58
 Spencer, H.G., Marshall, B.A. & Willan, R.C. (2009). Checklist of New Zealand living Mollusca. pp 196–219. in: Gordon, D.P. (ed.) New Zealand inventory of biodiversity. Volume one. Kingdom Animalia: Radiata, Lophotrochozoa, Deuterostomia. Canterbury University Press, Christchurch
 Marshall B.A. & Oliverio M. 2009. The Recent Coralliophilinae of the New Zealand region, with descriptions of two new species (Gastropoda: Neogastropoda: Muricidae). Molluscan Research 29: 155-173
 Liu, J.Y. [Ruiyu] (ed.). (2008). Checklist of marine biota of China seas. China Science Press. 1267 pp
 Severns, M. (2011). Shells of the Hawaiian Islands - The Sea Shells. Conchbooks, Hackenheim. 564 pp

External links
 Conrad, T. A. (1837). Description of new marine shells, from Upper California. Collected by Thomas Nuttall, Esq. Journal of the Academy of Natural Sciences, Philadelphia. 7: 227-268

bulbiformis
Gastropods described in 1837